The 1985 All-SEC football team consists of American football players selected to the All-Southeastern Conference (SEC) chosen by various selectors for the 1985 NCAA Division I-A football season.

Offensive selections

Receivers 

 Tim McGee, Tennessee (Coaches-1)
Albert Bell, Alabama (Coaches-1)

Tight ends 
 Jim Popp, Vanderbilt (Coaches-1)

Tackles
Will Wolford, Vanderbilt (Coaches-1)

Guards 
Bruce Wilkerson, Tennessee (Coaches-1)
Steve Wallace, Auburn (Coaches-1)
Jeff Zimmerman, Florida (Coaches-1)

Centers 
Peter Anderson, Georgia (Coaches-1)

Quarterbacks 

 Mike Shula, Alabama (Coaches-1)

Running backs 
Bo Jackson, Auburn (College Football Hall of Fame) (Coaches-1)
Dalton Hilliard, LSU (Coaches-1)

Defensive selections

Ends
Roland Barbay, LSU (Coaches-1)
Greg Waters, Georgia (Coaches-1)

Tackles 
Jon Hand, Alabama (Coaches-1)
Gerald Williams, Auburn (Coaches-1)
Harold Hallman, Auburn (Coaches-1)

Linebackers 
 Michael Brooks, LSU (Coaches-1)
Alonzo Johnson, Florida (Coaches-1)
 Cornelius Bennett, Alabama (Coaches-1)
 Dale Jones, Tennessee (Coaches-1)

Backs 
Chris White, Tennessee (Coaches-1)
John Little, Georgia (Coaches-1)
Tom Powell, Auburn (Coaches-1)
Norman Jefferson, LSU (Coaches-1)
Freddie Robinson, Alabama (Coaches-1)

Special teams

Kicker 
Carlos Reveiz, Tennessee (Coaches-1)

Punter 

 Bill Smith, Ole Miss (Coaches-1)

Key
AP = Associated Press

Coaches = selected by the SEC coaches

Bold = Consensus first-team selection by both AP and Coaches

See also
1985 College Football All-America Team

References

All-SEC
All-SEC football teams